Syd Byrnes (born 15 November 1940) is a South African former cyclist. He competed in the tandem and team pursuit events at the 1960 Summer Olympics.

References

External links
 

1940 births
Living people
South African male cyclists
Olympic cyclists of South Africa
Cyclists at the 1960 Summer Olympics
Sportspeople from Cape Town